Punniya Boomi is a 1978 Indian Tamil-language film, directed by  K. Vijayan and produced by N. V. Ramasamy. The film stars Sivaji Ganesan and Vanisri, with Sangeeta, Bhavani, M. N. Nambiar and V. K. Ramasamy in supporting roles. It is a remake of the 1957 Hindi film Mother India, which was previously remade in Telugu in 1971 as Bangaru Thalli.

Plot 
Manickam and Lakshmi are married. Manickam is mild mannered and timid. They had borrowed a lot of money for the marriage which multiplies by the time they had two children. The lender aims to take over their lands as he did with the rest of the people who owe him money and the only thing standing in his way is Lakshmi's hard-working nature. While Lakshmi's elder son is hard-working and timid, the younger son cannot bear to see the atrocities which slowly pushes him to the wrong side of law.

At one time, as vengeance, he plans to kidnap and molest the lender's daughter and he is killed by his own mother showing how, in India, for a mother, it is more important that her son is good than alive.

Cast 
Sivaji Ganesan as Manickam and Raju
Vanisri as Lakshmi
Sangeeta
Bhavani
Y. Vijaya
M. N. Nambiar
V. K. Ramasamy as Paramasivam
Manorama as Ponnammal
C. K. Saraswathi

Soundtrack 
All lyrics were written by Kannadasan.
 "Ninaivu Podhum"
 "Kadavulin Aanai"
 "Marughu Ennavo"
 "Jil Jil Endradhu"
 "Adi Manjal Veppilai Ittu"

References

External links 
 

1970s Tamil-language films
1978 films
Films directed by K. Vijayan
Films scored by M. S. Viswanathan
Tamil remakes of Hindi films